Vacys Reimeris (3 August 1921 in Kuršėnai, Lithuania – 6 February 2017) was a Lithuanian poet, translator, and artist of the former Lithuanian Soviet Socialist Republic (1965).

Biography 
He graduated from elementary school in Kuršėnai in 1934 and completed a gymnasium course called Savišvieta (Self-study, likely a form of correspondence program) in 1941. At the beginning of World War II, he was evacuated into Russia. He joined the Communist Party of the Soviet Union in 1945. After the war, he worked on radio in Kaunas.  He was the head of the Kaunas branch of the Lithuanian Writers' Union. He was the chief editor of the weekly newspaper of the Writers' Union Literatūra ir menas (Literature and Art, 1949–1959).

From 1951 to 1956 he studied at the Moscow Maxim Gorky Literature Institute. From 1952 to 1954 he was the secretary of the Lithuanian Writers' Union. In 1969–1986 he was editor in chief of the weekly newspaper Gimtasis kraštas (Native Land).

For a collection of poems Prie baltojo Tadž (By the White Taj, 1962) about India he was awarded the Jawaharlal Nehru Prize (1968). He received the State Prize of the Lithuanian SSR for a collection of poems for children Šarkos švarkas (Magpie's Jacket, 1975). In 1977 he won the Spring Poetry with Vėjo vynas (Wine of the Wind).

Works 
His first poem was published in 1934. The first book of poems Tėvų žemei (To Land of our Fathers) was published in 1945. Collections of poetry include Su pavasariu (With Spring, 1948), Ir skrenda daina (And a Song Flies, 1952), Su tavim aš kalbu (I'm Speaking with You, 1958), Žemė su puokšte gėlių (Earth with a Bouquet of Flowers, 1986), Į svečius Liliputijon (Visiting the Land of Lilliputs, 2001).

He published a collection of essays about Lithuania Lietuva - broliška žemė (Lithuania, A Brotherly Land, 1966) and a book of impressions of a trip to United States Užatlantės laiškai (Transatlantic Letters, 1974).

In poetry, his themes include official optimism, peaceful labor, heroism, and struggle for peace of the Soviet people. His poetry has features of a report, often with a distinct narrative story-line. Much of the poems include love lyrics (especially the collection Ave Maria).

Translations 
Reimeris translated into the Lithuanian language poems by Aleksandr Tvardovsky, Aleksandr Pushkin, Konstantin Simonov, and others.

Works of Reimeris were translated into the languages of the Soviet Union. There are known translations in English, Polish, Russian, Ukrainian and other languages.

References 
 Translated from Russian Wikipedia
 Outline of the History of Lithuanian Soviet literature. Moscow, 1956.

Specific

External links 
 Reimeris, Vacys 
 Poems by Vacys Reimeris

1921 births
2017 deaths
People from Kuršėnai
Lithuanian male poets
Soviet male poets
20th-century male writers
Lithuanian newspaper editors